Grand Prince Jinan (1354 – 15 January 1394), personal name Yi Bang-u or Lee Bang-woo, was a nobleman during the late Goryeo dynasty who become a prince of Joseon as the first son of King Taejo and Queen Sinui.

Biography

He became the general secretary of the last king of Goryeo dynasty. In year 1388, his father, King Taejo, overthrew Goryeo dynasty. After witnessing this incident, he went to Bogae mountain in Chelwon to retire. Later on, he went to Hamheung, which is located in present-day North Korea; there, he died at the age of 40.

In 1392, when King Taejo was giving out titles, his first son became as known as Grand Prince Jinan.

In the annals of Joseon dynasty, it describes Grand Prince Jinan as a man who liked alcoholic beverages, and states that he drank copious amount until he died.
However, according to a memorial stone of Grand Prince Jinan, which was made in 1789, "Grand Prince Jinan was an exemplary son to his parent, who took good care of his brother and sisters. When he grew older, he minded in literature and practiced humble life style and did not fancy wealth nor authority.”

Family
Father: King Taejo of Joseon (조선 태조) (27 October 1335 – 18 June 1408)
Grandfather: King Hwanjo of Joseon (조선 환조) (1315 – 1 January 1361)
Grandmother: Queen Uihye of the Yeongheung Choe clan (의혜왕후 최씨)
Mother: Queen Sinui of the Cheongju Han clan (신의왕후 한씨) (September 1337 – 21 October 1391)
Grandfather: Han Gyeong (한경)
Grandmother: Lady Shin of the Saknyeong Shin clan (삭녕 신씨)
Consorts and their respective issue(s):
Lady Ji of the Chungju Ji clan (충주 지씨)
Yi Bok-geun, Prince Bongnyeong (봉녕군 이복근) (? – 3 November 1421), first son
Princess Gyeonghye (경혜옹주), first daughter
Lady Wang of the Haeju Wang clan (해주 왕씨)
Yi Deok-geun, Prince Sunnyeong (순녕군 이덕근) (? – 25 April 1412), second son
Second daughter

In popular culture
 Portrayed by Tae Min-yeong in the 1983 KBS TV series Foundation of the Kingdom.
 Portrayed by Jeon In-taek in the 1983 MBC TV series The King of Chudong Palace.
 Portrayed by Im Jeong-ha in the 1996–1998 KBS TV series Tears of the Dragon.
 Portrayed by Jeong Chan-hu in the 2012–2013 SBS TV series The Great Seer.
 Portrayed by Kang In-ki in the 2014 KBS1 TV series Jeong Do-jeon.
 Portrayed by Lee Seung-hyo in the 2015–2016 SBS TV series Six Flying Dragons.

References 

The information in this article is based on that in its Korean equivalent.

Korean princes
1354 births
1394 deaths
House of Yi
Joseon dynasty